Richard Eliot Chamberlin (20 March 1923, Cambridge, Massachusetts – 14 March 1994) was an American mathematician, specializing in geometric topology.

R. Eliot Chamberlin's father was Ralph Vary Chamberlin. Eliot Chamberlin attended East High School  in Salt Lake City. He received his bachelor's degree from the University of Utah. In the early 1940s he was a teaching fellow in physics at the University of Utah and then the Massachusetts Institute of Technology. After serving as an instructor of physics at Northeastern University, he served two years in the United States Navy during World War II. After discharge from the Navy, he entered graduate school in mathematics at Harvard University, and received his Ph.D. in 1950 with thesis supervisor Hassler Whitney.

Chamberlin joined the faculty of the mathematics department at the University of Utah in 1949 and retired there as professor emeritus on 1 July 1988.  Chamberlin gave an invited address at the International Congress of Mathematicians in 1950 in Cambridge, Massachusetts.

Selected publications

References

1923 births
1994 deaths
People from Cambridge, Massachusetts
United States Navy personnel of World War II
Mathematicians from Massachusetts
20th-century American mathematicians
Topologists
Institute for Advanced Study visiting scholars
University of Utah alumni
Harvard Graduate School of Arts and Sciences alumni
University of Utah faculty